Toni Kordic (born 1 January 1964) is a Canadian basketball player. She competed in the women's tournament at the 1984 Summer Olympics.

References

External links
 

1964 births
Living people
Canadian women's basketball players
Olympic basketball players of Canada
Basketball players at the 1984 Summer Olympics
Sportspeople from Edmonton